The 2016 Columbia Lions football team represented Columbia University in the 2016 NCAA Division I FCS football season. They were led by second year head coach Al Bagnoli and played their home games at Robert K. Kraft Field at Lawrence A. Wien Stadium. They are a member of the Ivy League. Columbia averaged 5,212 fans per game.

Schedule

Game summaries

Saint Francis (PA)

at Georgetown

Princeton

at Wagner

References

Columbia
Columbia Lions football seasons
Columbia Lions football